was an old province of Japan which today consists of the eastern part of Shimane Prefecture. It was sometimes called . The province is in the Chūgoku region.

History 
During the early Kofun period (3rd century) this region was independent and constructed rectangular tumuli. But in the fourth century this region saw the construction of rectangular and key shaped tumuli.

During the 6th or 7th century it was absorbed due to the expansion of the state of Yamato, within which it assumed the role of a sacerdotal domain.

Today, the Izumo Shrine constitutes (as does the Grand Shrine of Ise) one of the most important sacred places of Shinto: it is dedicated to kami, especially to Ōkuninushi (Ō-kuni-nushi-no-mikoto), mythical progeny of Susanoo and all the clans of Izumo. The mythological mother of Japan, the goddess Izanami, is said to be buried on Mt. Hiba, at the border of the old provinces of Izumo and Hōki, near modern-day Yasugi of Shimane Prefecture.

By the Sengoku period, Izumo had lost much of its importance. It was dominated before the Battle of Sekigahara by the Mōri clan, and after Sekigahara, it was an independent fief with a castle town at modern Matsue.

In Japanese mythology, the entrance to Yomi (Hell, land of the dead) was located within the province, and was sealed by the god Izanagi by placing a large boulder over the entrance.

Historical districts
 Shimane Prefecture
 Aika District (秋鹿郡) - merged with Ou and Shimane Districts to become Yatsuka District (八束郡) on April 1, 1896
 Iishi District (飯石郡)
 Izumo District (出雲郡) - merged with Kando and Tatenui Districts to become Hikawa District (簸川郡) on April 1, 1896
 Kando District (神門郡) - merged with Izumo and Tatenui Districts to become Hikawa District on April 1, 1896
 Nita District (仁多郡)
 Nogi District (能義郡) - dissolved
 Ohara District (大原郡) - dissolved
 Ou District (意宇郡) - merged with Aika and Shimane Districts to become Yatsuka District on April 1, 1896
 Shimane District (島根郡) - merged with Aika and Ou Districts to become Yatsuka Districton April 1, 1896
 Tatenui District (楯縫郡) - merged with Izumo and Kando Districts to become Hikawa District on April 1, 1896

See also
 Hirose Domain
 Mori Domain (Izumo) 
 Matsue Domain

Notes

References
 Nussbaum, Louis-Frédéric and Käthe Roth. (2005).  Japan encyclopedia. Cambridge: Harvard University Press. ;  OCLC 58053128

External links 

 "Izumo Province" at JapaneseCastleExplorer.com
  Murdoch's map of provinces, 1903